The men's 4 × 10 kilometre relay at the 2003 Asian Winter Games was held on February 7, 2003 at Ajara Athletic Park, Japan.

Schedule
All times are Japan Standard Time (UTC+09:00)

Results

References

Results FIS

External links
Results of the Fifth Winter Asian Games

Men Relay